Kfar Chleymane also Kfarchleiman is a small village of the Batroun District in the north of Lebanon located 16 km from Batroun and 69 km from Beirut.

Etymology
According to Anis Freiha's "A Dictionary of the Names of Towns and Villages in Lebanon", Kfar Chleymane comes from Syriac and means The Village of Sleiman.

Demographics
Kfar Chleimane 's population is Maronite Christian and consists of member of only one family (Bassil) which is believed to originate from Dunnieh in Tripoli.

Church
The Our Lady of Naya church is the only one in Kfar Chleymane and is known for its 12th century vestige. Frescoes representing the Christ or other Christian scenes can be found in a little cave carved in the stone under the church. Parts of the frescoes were burnt by mistake before their historical importance was discovered. Moreover, the stones around the church are carved into stairs that can also be dated to the 12th century.

Legend
An ancient legend says that under the soil of the church exists a hidden convent, but nobody knows if those legends are true and no researches were ever led.

Batroun District
Populated places in Lebanon